The Road Goes Ever On is a song cycle first published in 1967 as a book of sheet music and as an audio recording.  The music was written by Donald Swann, and the words are taken from poems in J. R. R. Tolkien's Middle-earth writings, especially The Lord of the Rings. 
The title of the song cycle is taken from "The Road Goes Ever On", the first song in the collection. The songs are designed to fit together when played in sequence. The ninth song "Lúthien Tinúviel" was added in an appendix rather than in the main sequence.
Swann performed the cycle for Tolkien, who approved of the music except for the Quenya song "Namárië"; he suggested it should be in the style of a Gregorian chant, which he hummed; Swann used that melody for the song.

Music 

With Tolkien's approval, Donald Swann wrote the music for this song cycle; much of it resembles English traditional music or folk music. The sole exception is the Quenya song "Namárië", which was based on a tune by Tolkien himself that has some affinities to Gregorian chant. In his foreword to the second edition, Swann explains that he performed the song cycle to Tolkien in Priscilla Tolkien's garden; Tolkien approved of the music except for "Namárië", and hummed its melody; Swann used that for the song.

Non-musical content 

This book has been valued even by those uninterested in music, since it helps Tolkien's readers to better understand the cultures of the various mythological beings presented in Middle-earth, and helps linguists analyse Tolkien's poetry. As well as the poems, notes, and translations, Tolkien contributed decorations in the form of elvish script for the top and bottom of every page of sheet music, and tailpieces for the spaces at the ends of the poems. The book contains one of the longest samples of the constructed language Quenya, in the shape of the song "Namárië", as well as the Sindarin prayer "A Elbereth Gilthoniel", with grammatical explanations. Tolkien's notes in the book provided information about the First Age of Middle-earth that was not otherwise publicly available until 1977, when The Silmarillion appeared.

Publication history 

The first edition of The Road Goes Ever On: a Song Cycle was published on 31 October 1967, in the United States.

An LP record that included the song cycle was recorded on 12 June 1967 as Poems and Songs of Middle Earth, with Donald Swann on piano and William Elvin singing. Side one of this record consisted of Tolkien himself reading six poems from The Adventures of Tom Bombadil. The first track on side two was Tolkien reading part of the Elvish prayer "A Elbereth Gilthoniel" from book 2, chapter 1 of The Lord of the Rings. The remainder of side two contained the song cycle performed by Swann and Elvin. The LP record was released by Caedmon Records (TC 1231).

The second edition of The Road Goes Ever On, published in 1978, added music for "Bilbo's Last Song."  This song was also published separately.

The third edition, published in 1993, added music for "Lúthien Tinúviel" from The Silmarillion, which had earlier appeared in The Songs of Donald Swann: Volume I.  The third edition of The Road Goes Ever On was packaged with a CD that duplicated the song cycle (but not Tolkien's readings) from the 1967 LP record.  The CD also included two new recordings.  The third edition was reprinted in hardcover in 2002 by Harper Collins; this had the same text and CD as the 1993 edition.

On 10 June 1995, the song cycle was performed in Rotterdam under the auspices of the Dutch Tolkien Society, by the baritone Jan Krediet together with the chamber choir EnSuite and Alexandra Swemer on the piano. A CD of this concert was published in a limited edition.

List of songs 

The 1967 song-cycle, on LP and CD, is as follows. Keys are given, but Swann notes in the foreword to the third edition that transposition is acceptable.

The following songs were added to the CD (but not the LP) after the first edition. A Elbereth Gilthoniel forms a continuation of song 6, "I Sit Beside the Fire", in the text, but is a separate track on the CD. "Lúthien Tinúviel" has an ambiguous status: it is shown as song 9 of the cycle in the table of contents, but it is placed in an appendix, not the main cycle, with a note that it could be incorporated into the main sequence by singing it in D major, described by Swann as "a more baritonal key".

Analysis 

The scholar Richard Leonberger states that Swann composed the nine settings over a period of 12 years. He began by setting seven poems from The Lord of the Rings to music in Ramallah, near Jerusalem, in 1965. These included A Elbereth Gilthoniel and O Orofarnë, Lassemista, Carnimírië; he replaced the latter with Namárië for the first edition as he felt it was too similar to Henry Purcell's "Dido's Lament".

The scholar of music Emily Sulka notes that the song cycle was created because Swann and his wife liked Tolkien's writings, and set six of the poems to music. Tolkien liked five of the settings, but proposed a melody similar to a Gregorian chant in place of the sixth, for Namárië. She notes too that Swann wanted them to be performed as a group without applause between the songs. In her view, the cycle has the theme of travel: the walking songs launch into an adventure to unknown lands, but returning home; "In the Willow-Meads of Tasarinan" speaks of Treebeard's travels in many lands, from spring to winter; "In Western Lands" in contrast begins with Sam in despondent mood, but ends with a feeling of hope. "I Sit Beside the Fire" portrays a traveller, Bilbo, reflecting on his journeys; it ends with a quotation of the melody of "The Road Goes Ever On", a poem that recurs (adapted to each context) in The Lord of the Rings. Sulka thus sees Tolkien and Swann using the poems and music to link the story of the novel with "the road always continuing, even when one's individual travel is finished". She finds Swann's account of Tolkien's poems "highly effective".

The educationist Estelle Jorgensen states that she was "struck by Swann's simple, folklike, and tonal strophic settings, harking back to an earlier time before atonal music, which seems appropriate to the rustic character of the hobbits and others he portrays." She notes that the chosen texts reflect the journey and its metaphor of the road of life, ending with the longest of the poems, "Errantry", in which the wanderer ends one journey and begins the next. In her view, the setting of "In the willow-meads of Tasarinan" captures Treebeard's strength and resilience, but not the quality of chanting that Tolkien mentions, nor the fact that the Ents had been influenced by elvish music.

For music education, Jorgensen writes that the familiarity of Peter Jackson's films of The Lord of the Rings means that Tolkien's mythology can be explored via Tolkien's prose, his poetry, film, and music. She suggests that the poetry can be compared with Swann's settings; and that "students can improvise, compose, perform, and record" their own melodies for the texts, or write and perform their own stories in which the songs might feature. She notes that in Middle-earth, singing was natural and a pleasure, as it was in times before amplified popular music changed the style of the human voice.

Notes

References

External links 
 The Donald Swann website

Middle-earth books
Music based on Middle-earth
Middle-earth poetry
1995 soundtrack albums
Allen & Unwin books
Book soundtracks
Song cycles